Kethy Õunpuu (born 4 December 1987) is an Estonian football player who plays for and captains both Naiste Meistriliiga club Flora Tallinn and the Estonia women's national football team.

International career
She made her debut for the Estonia women's national football team on 27 June 2008 against Turkey and has since been capped more than 100 times.

References

External links

1987 births
Living people
Estonian women's footballers
Estonia women's international footballers
Women's association football midfielders
FIFA Century Club
FC Flora (women) players